The 2021 Duke's Mayo Bowl was a college football bowl game played on December 30, 2021, at Bank of America Stadium in Charlotte, North Carolina. The 20th edition of the Duke's Mayo Bowl, and the second under its current name, the contest featured the North Carolina Tar Heels of the Atlantic Coast Conference and the South Carolina Gamecocks of the Southeastern Conference. The game began at 11:30 a.m. EST and was televised on ESPN. It was one of the 2021–22 bowl games concluding the 2021 FBS football season. Duke's Mayonnaise served as the game's title sponsor.

Teams
This was the 20th edition of the game, though only the second under its current name; the bowl had previously gone by three other names since its inauguration in 2002. Consistent with conference tie-ins, the game featured the North Carolina Tar Heels from the Atlantic Coast Conference (ACC) and the South Carolina Gamecocks from the Southeastern Conference (SEC). This was the 59th meeting between North Carolina and South Carolina, who spent 1953 to 1970 in the ACC together; entering the game, the Tar Heels led the all-time series, 35–19–4. The teams' last met in a pair of season-opening contests in 2015, won by South Carolina, and 2019, won by North Carolina; both games were also played at Bank of America Stadium in Charlotte. Additionally, the teams are scheduled to meet again in Charlotte in 2023 and have scheduled a home-and-home series for 2028 and 2029. This was North Carolina's 36th overall bowl game appearance and their fifth in this particular game, having competed in 2004, 2008, 2009 and 2013. South Carolina made their 24th overall bowl game appearance and their second in this particular game, with their lone previous appearance coming in 2018.

North Carolina Tar Heels

North Carolina finished their regular season with an overall 6–6 record, 3–5 in ACC games. After starting with two wins in their first three games, the team alternated losses and wins for the rest of the season. The Tar Heels played four ranked teams, losing to Notre Dame, Pittsburgh, and NC State while defeating Wake Forest.

South Carolina Gamecocks

South Carolina also finished their regular season with an overall 6–6 record, 3–5 in SEC games. After starting with two wins followed by two losses, the team alternated wins and losses for the rest of the season. The Gamecocks played three ranked teams, losing to Georgia, Texas A&M, and Clemson.

Game summary

Statistics
Team statistics
Individual statistics

See also
 North Carolina–South Carolina football rivalry

References

External links
 Game statistics at statbroadcast.com

Duke's Mayo Bowl
Duke's Mayo Bowl
North Carolina Tar Heels football bowl games
South Carolina Gamecocks football bowl games
Duke's Mayo Bowl
Duke's Mayo Bowl